Harriet Mabel Spalding (January 10, 1862 – August 14, 1935) was an American litterateur and poet. She became well known in the highest circles of art and literature in Albany, New York, Chicago, and New York City.

Early life and education
Harriet Mabel Spalding was born in Gloversville, New York, January 10, 1862. She was the daughter of Rev. N. G. Spalding, a prominent clergyman in the Troy conference of the Methodist Episcopal Church. Her parents possessed literary talents. Her father was a graduate of Union College, and a brilliant orator. Her mother, Harriet Dorr, was a graduate of Mrs. Willard's Troy Seminary, and an artist of merit.  Harriet had three siblings: Dorr Spalding, Dr. Warren Clyde Spalding, and Nathaniel Bull Spalding.

Harriet inherited the talents of both parents. In 1868, the family removed to Schodack Landing, New York. Harriet was carefully and liberally educated. In 1877, she was graduated in the Albany Female Academy, where she won six gold medals offered by the alumni in various branches of composition.

Career
She began to write verses at the age of nine years. She wrote much and her work was widely copied. Spalding was the author of a volume of poems.

She died August 14, 1935, in Schenectady, New York, and was buried at Albany Rural Cemetery, Menands, New York.

Style and themes
Her sonnets have been characterized by a critic as among the finest in the English language. A singular charm pervades all her verse. Its art was always sure, her methods of composition being invariably conscientious and painstaking, while its spirit –whether dealing with pathos or passion– is of rare grace and beauty. One sonnet in particular, "The Singers", fairly takes one's breath away with its pity and power.

References

Attribution

External links
 
 

1862 births
1935 deaths
19th-century American writers
19th-century American women writers
People from Gloversville, New York
Writers from New York (state)
American women poets
Wikipedia articles incorporating text from A Woman of the Century